Cutter v. Wilkinson, 544 U.S. 709 (2005), was a United States Supreme Court case in which the Court held that, under the Religious Land Use and Institutionalized Persons Act (RLUIPA), facilities that accept federal funds cannot deny prisoners accommodations that are necessary to engage in activities for the practice of their own religious beliefs.

RLUIPA prohibited the federal government from imposing a substantial burden on prisoners' freedom of religion. Five residents of an Ohio prison, which included two adherents of Asatru,  a minister of the white supremacist Church of Jesus Christ Christian,  a Wiccan and a Satanist filed suit. The men stated in federal district court that prison officials violated RLUIPA by failing to accommodate the inmates' exercise of their "nonmainstream" religions. Prison officials argued that the act "improperly advanced religion and thus violated the First Amendment's establishment clause which prohibited government from making laws "respecting an establishment of religion." The district court had originally rejected that argument and ruled for the inmates. The Sixth Circuit Court of Appeals had reversed the decision.

Question presented
Did a federal law prohibiting government from burdening prisoners' religious exercise violate the First Amendment's establishment clause?

Decision of the Court
The Court returned a unanimous opinion, written by Justice Ginsburg, with a concurring opinion by Justice Thomas. Ruling in favor of the inmates, the Court held that, on its face, RLUIPA made an accommodation allowed by the First Amendment. The Court noted that constitutional problems could arise if RLUIPA were "enforced improperly and religious prisoners received favored treatment, or if religious exercise and security concerns were not properly balanced."

See also
 Religion in United States prisons

References

External links

 Duke Law School page on Cutter v. Wilkinson

2005 in religion
2005 in United States case law
Ásatrú in the United States
Establishment Clause case law
Minority rights
Penal system in the United States
Satanism in the United States
United States Supreme Court cases of the Rehnquist Court
White supremacy in the United States
Wicca in the United States
United States Supreme Court cases
2000s in modern paganism